Roberto Mauro de Oliveira (born April 12, 1941), is a former Brazilian soccer player who played in the NASL.

Career statistics

Club

Notes

References

Living people
Brazilian footballers
Brazilian expatriate footballers
Association football forwards
América Futebol Clube (MG) players
Bangu Atlético Clube players
Clube Atlético Mineiro players
Washington Whips players
Villa Nova Atlético Clube players
North American Soccer League (1968–1984) players
Expatriate soccer players in the United States
Brazilian expatriate sportspeople in the United States
1941 births
Footballers from Belo Horizonte